Thynedale is a census-designated place in Mecklenburg County, Virginia, just north of Chase City. The population as of the 2010 Census was 197.

References

Census-designated places in Mecklenburg County, Virginia
Census-designated places in Virginia